The Wyandotte County Courthouse, located at 710 N. 7th St. in Kansas City, Kansas, is a courthouse which was listed on the National Register of Historic Places in 2002.

It was designed in Classical Revival style by architects Wight and Wight, and was built by contractor Godfrey Swensen.

References

External links

Courthouses in Kansas
National Register of Historic Places in Wyandotte County, Kansas
Neoclassical architecture in Kansas